Erwin Lindner (7 April 1888 – 30 November 1988) was a German entomologist mainly interested in Diptera.

He was born in Böglins, Memmingen and died in Stuttgart, aged 100 years.

In 1913 Erwin Lindner joined the State Museum of Natural History Stuttgart and was head of the Department of Entomology there until 1953. He edited Die Fliegen der paläarktischen Region (the Flies of the Palaearctic Region), a twelve-volume seminal work on the systematics and anatomy of the flies of the Palearctic realm.
Lindner, a passionate collector, participated in several expeditions traveled to Dalmatia, the Gran Chaco, Anatolia, Liguria, East Africa, Italy, Spain and the regions of the Alps.

References
Evenhuis, N. L. 1997: Litteratura taxonomica dipterorum (1758-1930). Volume 1 (A-K); Volume 2 (L-Z). Leiden, Backhuys Publishers : 458-470, Portrait and Schriftenverzeichnis.
Harde, K. W. 1969: 100 Jahre Entomologischer Verein Stuttgart. Stuttgart : Entomologischer Verein Stuttgart 1869 e.V : 1-15	7-8

German entomologists
Dipterists
1888 births
1988 deaths
German centenarians
Men centenarians
20th-century German zoologists